Liberty Township is a township in Wright County, Iowa, USA.

References

Townships in Wright County, Iowa
Townships in Iowa